Kuran castle is a historical castle located in Baneh County in Kurdistan Province.

References 

Castles in Iran